High-energy visible light (HEV light) is high-frequency, high-energy light in the violet/blue band from 400 to 450 nm in the visible spectrum, which has a number of biological effects, including those on the eye.

HEV light may be a cause of age-related macular degeneration. Some sunglasses and beauty creams specifically block HEV, for added marketing value.

Currently, a 2019 report by France's Agency for Food, Environmental and Occupational Health & Safety (ANSES) supports the 2010 result on the adverse effect of blue LED light (400-450 nm spike) on the eye, which can lead to impaired vision. It highlights short-term effects on the retina linked to intense exposure to blue LED light, and long-term effects linked to the onset of age-related macular degeneration. Although few studies have examined occupational causes of macular degeneration, they show that long-term sunlight exposure, specifically its blue-light component, is associated with macular degeneration in outdoor workers.

Harvard Health Publishing additionally asserts that exposure to blue light (especially blue LED light, but also broad-spectrum blue light) at night has a stronger negative effect on sleep. A June 14, 2016 press release by the American Medical Association concludes that there are negative health impacts from the unrestrained use of LED street lighting in general. Lenses that block blue light may be particularly useful for people with insomnia, bipolar disorder, delayed sleep phase disorder, or ADHD, though less beneficial for healthy sleepers.

Background 

Blue light is a range of the visible light spectrum, defined as having a wavelength between 400 and 525  nm. This includes wavelengths between violet and cyan in the spectrum. Narrow-spectrum blue light (also called blue LED light or short-wavelength LED light) is a type of high-energy visible light, defined as having a wavelength between 400 and 450  nm. This light is common in LEDs (even when used in illumination products) as a carry-over from computer-screen technology.

Blue light is an essential component of white light. White can be made from either narrow-spectrum or broad-spectrum blue. For example, LED technology tends to combine narrow-spectrum blue and yellow, while other technologies include more cyan and red. Fluorescent coatings generate violet and cyan spikes, in addition to having a smaller narrow-spectrum blue component. Natural light has a much more even distribution of blue wavelengths than most artificial light.

Blue LED light 

Blue LED light sources are becoming increasingly common in today's environment. Exposure to blue light comes from a variety of technologies including computers, televisions, and lights. Much of the harmful exposure arises from light-emitting diodes (LEDs). Today, many white LEDs are produced by pairing a blue LED with a lower-energy phosphor, thereby creating solid-state light (SSL). This is often considered “the next generation of illumination” as SSL technology dramatically reduces energy resource requirements.

Increasingly, people are exposed to blue LED light via everyday technology. The 2015 Pew Research Center study found that 68% of U.S. adults own a smartphone and 45% own a tablet. The study also found that levels of technology ownership vary by age; 86% of Americans 18-29 and 83% of those 30-49 own smartphones.  Younger Americans also use high rates of blue light technologies. The survey of Common Sense Media in 2013 also demonstrated that 72% of children age 0–8 years old used mobile devices for watching videos and playing games.  Moreover, 93% of teens owned a computer or had access to one at home. In contrast, computer ownership rates are lower for older Americans.

Concerns regarding prolonged exposure to blue LED light

On eye health  
Blue-light hazard is the potential for photochemically-induced retinal injury resulting from electromagnetic radiation-exposure at wavelengths primarily between 400 and  Researchers have not studied the phenomenon in humans, but only (and inconclusively) in some rodent, primate, and in vitro studies. Photochemically-induced retinal injury is caused by the absorption of light by photoreceptors in the eye. Under normal conditions, when light hits a photoreceptor, the cell bleaches and becomes useless until it has recovered through a metabolic process called the visual cycle.

Absorption of blue light, however, has been shown in rats and in a susceptible strain of mice to cause a problem in the process so that cells become unbleached and responsive again to light before they are ready. At wavelengths of blue light below 430 nm this greatly increases the potential for oxidative damage. For blue-light circadian therapy, harm is minimized by employing blue light at the near-green end of the blue spectrum. "1-2 min of 408 nm and 25 minutes of 430 nm are sufficient to cause irreversible death of photoreceptors and lesions of the retinal pigment epithelium. [...] The action spectrum of light-sensitive retinal ganglion cells was found to peak at approximately 450 nm, a range with lower damage potential, yet not completely outside the damaging range."
 
One study has given more insight into the blue-light hazard: permanent damage to the eye cells, as reported by a research-team from Toledo University.

The CIE published its position on the low risk of blue-light hazard resulting from the use of LED technology in general lighting bulbs in April 2019.

Concerns regarding blue LEDs are related to the difference between the photopic luminous flux and radiometric radiance. Photometry is concerned with the study of human perception of visible light, while radiometry is concerned with the measurement of energy. At the outer edges of the range of light perception, the amount of energy as light required to register as a perception increases. The perception of the brightness of different frequencies of light is defined according to the CIE luminosity function V(λ). The peak efficiency of light perception is defined at 555  nm, having a value of V(λ)=1. Blue LEDs, particularly those used in white LEDs, operate at around 450  nm, where V(λ)=0.038. This means that blue light at 450 nm requires more than 26 times the radiometric energy for one to perceive the same luminous flux as green light at 555 nm. For comparison, UV-A at 380  nm (V(λ)=0.000 039) requires 25 641 times the amount of radiometric energy to be perceived at the same intensity as green, three orders of magnitude greater than blue LEDs. Studies often compare animal trials using identical luminous flux rather than radiance meaning comparative levels of perceived light at different frequencies rather than total emitted energy. As interest in LED backlighting has increased, so has the technology developed. Studies often select low-quality generic LEDs from little-known brands with a high proportion of blue light, especially selecting low CRI LEDs which are not suitable for either lighting or backlight technologies. LCD screens and LED lighting generally use much higher CRI LEDs as consumers demand accurate color reproduction. White LEDs are designed to emulate natural sunlight as closely as is economically and technologically possible. Natural sunlight has a relatively high spectral density of blue light making exposure to relatively high levels of blue light not a new or unique phenomenon despite the relatively recent emergence of LED display technologies.

IOLs (Intraocular lenses) are the ideal test model in-vivo on human models. They cannot be removed and are persistently active 24/7 owing to the fact that they are permanently implanted into the eye. A Cochrane Review as well as a recent systematic review found no evidence of any effect in IOLs filtering blue light. None of the studies reviewed provided any reliable statistical evidence to suggest any effect regarding contrast sensitivity, macular degeneration, vision, color-discrimination or sleep disturbances. A particular study claimed a large difference in observed fluorescein angiography examinations concluding they observed markedly less "progression of abnormal fundus autofluorescence"  however the authors failed to discuss the fact that the excitation beam is filtered light between 465 and 490 nm, is largely blocked by blue light filtering IOLs but not clear IOLs present in the control patients.

The international standard IEC 62471 assesses the safety of light sources, including blue light.

Aggressive marketing 
Aggressive advertisements may contribute to the incorrect public perception of the purported dangers of blue light. Even when research has shown no evidence to support the use of blue-blocking filters as a clinical treatment for digital eye strain, ophthalmic lens manufacturers continue to market them as lenses that reduce digital eye strain. A sponsored post on NewGradOptometry promoted sales training from Essilor and their product range (including the moral benefits), then segued into the amoral nature of upselling unnecessary lenses, finishing by arguing that patients will go blind without blue-filtering lenses. Essilor provided a pair of free glasses to a fashion blogger who did not need prescription glasses but nonetheless quoted a large number of Essilor marketing pitches including the blindness-preventing promises of their blue-light filtering technology. The Essilor website claims that one may experience vision loss without their special filtering lenses, whether one requires prescription glasses or not. Zeiss offers a similar product yet does not make nearly as extreme claims.

The UK's General Optical Council has criticised Boots Opticians for their unsubstantiated claims regarding their line of blue-light filtering lenses; and the Advertising Standards Authority fined them £40,000. Boots Opticians sold the lenses for a £20 markup. Trevor Warburton, speaking on behalf of the UK Association of Optometrists stated: "...current evidence does not support making claims that they prevent eye disease."

Despite the problem of deceptive marketing practices, the aforementioned ANSES report, from 2019, " highlights [the] disruptive effects to biological rhythms and sleep, linked to exposure to even very low levels of blue light in the evening or at night, particularly via screens", thus there are legitimate concerns as to the unconstrained use of LED lighting.

Apple's and Microsoft's operating systems and even the preset settings of standalone computer monitors include options to reduce blue-light emissions by adjusting color temperature to a warmer gamut.
These settings dramatically reduce the color gamut of the display, sacrificing the usability of devices without providing any of the alleged benefits of reducing eye strain or preventing circadian rhythm disruption.

Much of this marketing fails to distinguish between the sharp, 400-450 nm blue spike in mainstream LED bulbs, versus the broad-spectrum blue (up to 525 nm cyan) present in other lighting technologies (including pre-LED technologies, and very new, cyan-rich LED technologies that go beyond the older CRI metrics), and natural light.

Benefits of broad-spectrum blue light
Broad-spectrum blue light (for example, including cyan wavelengths, such as in natural light or most fluorescent lights) is essential to wakefulness, because it stimulates melanopsin receptors in the eye. This suppresses daytime melatonin, enabling wakefulness. Working in blue-free light (aka yellow light) for long periods of time disrupts circadian patterns because there is no melatonin suppression during the day, and reduced melatonin rebound at night.

Dermatology
Blue light within the range 400-450 nm has been reported in a number of studies to be effective as local treatment of eczema and psoriasis, as it purportedly helps dampen the immune response. Recent studies have also shown improvement of facial acne upon exposure to a LED emitting at 414 nm. A combination of exposure to red and blue lights is used more and more in clinical dermatologic therapies. Constructors such as Philips currently develop devices and techniques emitting in the blue visible spectrum to be used in dermatologic therapy.

See also
Fluorescent lamps and health
Phase response curve#Light
Ultraviolet light

References

External links

Ophthalmology
Optical spectrum
Technology hazards
Circadian rhythm
Sleeplessness and sleep deprivation